The Glomma, or Glåma, is Norway's longest and most voluminous river.

Geography

At its fullest length, the river runs from the lake Aursund near Røros in Trøndelag and runs into the Oslofjord at Fredrikstad. Major tributaries include the Vorma River, which drains Lake Mjøsa, joining the Glomma River at Årnes in Nes. The Lågen drains into Lake Mjøsa, collecting drainage from the large Gudbrandsdalen and significantly increasing the Glomma's flow.

Because it flows through some of the richest forest districts, it has historically been Norway's leading log-floating river. The combination of raw materials, water power, and easy transport has over the centuries encouraged industry along the Glomma. Some of the country's largest manufacturing and processing concerns are found around its mouth, where supplies of timber and hydropower have been backed by excellent port facilities.

Above Røros the forest is restricted to the valley floor.

The upper river valleys of Norwegian rivers have distinctive names which are vestiges of earlier cultural distinctions such as building styles, traditional clothing or bunad and domestic crafts.  The upper valley of the Glomma is the Østerdal (or East Valley).

Upon entering Lake Øyeren at Fetsund, the Glomma has formed Europe's largest inland delta which reaches the opposite side of the lake, across its short axis. Some of the vast amount of silt that the Glomma deposits in Lake Øyeren is extracted to manufacture LECA building blocks widely used for in the construction of foundations in Norway.

Name
The form Glomma is used in Østfold and Akershus counties, while in Innlandet and Trøndelag counties the river is called (and written) Glåma.  An older form was Glaumr; another, in Old Norse, was Raumelfr, meaning a "loud noise" or "thunder" + "river".

Several places are named after the river, for instance Glåmdal and Glåmos.

See also
 :Category:Populated places on the Glomma River

References

External links

Rivers of Viken
Rivers of Innlandet
Rivers of Trøndelag
Ramsar sites in Norway
Rivers of Norway